Baker Gurvitz Army is Baker Gurvitz Army's first studio album.

Track listing 
"Help Me" (Adrian Gurvitz) – 4:34
"Love Is" (Gurvitz) – 2:47
"Memory Lane" (Ginger Baker, Gurvitz) – 4:46
"Inside of Me" (Gurvitz) – 5:33
"I Wanna Live Again" (Baker, Gurvitz) – 4:22
"Mad Jack" (Baker, Gurvitz) – 7:54
"4 Phil" (Baker, Gurvitz) – 4:25
"Since Beginning" (Gurvitz) – 8:05

Personnel
 Ginger Baker – composer, drums, percussion, producer, vibraphone, vocals
 Madeline Bell – vocals
 Cyrano – engineer
 Martyn Ford – orchestration
 Adrian Gurvitz – composer, guitar, producer, vocals
 Paul Gurvitz – bass guitar, producer, vocals
 Rosetta Hightower – vocals
 Ulf Marquardt	- Liner Notes
 Anton Matthews – Mixing Engineer
 John Mitchell – keyboards, backing vocals
 Barry St. John – vocals
 Liza Strike – vocals
 Mixed at Trident Studios and Island Studios

References

1974 debut albums
Baker Gurvitz Army albums
Vertigo Records albums
Albums recorded at Trident Studios